Albert Kerwin "Doc" Aldinger (July 4, 1873 – October 18, 1957) was an American football, basketball and baseball player and coach. He served as the head men's basketball coach at Bloomsburg University of Pennsylvania from 1901 to 1905.

References

External links

 

1873 births
1957 deaths
Albany Senators players
Basketball coaches from Pennsylvania
Bloomsburg Blue Jays players
Bloomsburg Huskies football coaches
Bloomsburg Huskies men's basketball coaches
Oswego Grays players
Oswego Pioneers players
Vermont Catamounts baseball players
People from York, Pennsylvania
Players of American football from Pennsylvania